Ponte dell'Olio is a comune (municipality) in the Province of Piacenza in the Italian region Emilia-Romagna, located about  south of Piacenza, about  south of Milan and about  northwest of Bologna.

The municipality of Ponte dell'Olio contains the frazioni (subdivisions, mainly villages and hamlets) Folignano, Torrano, Zaffignano, Castione, Sarmata, Monte Santo, Biana, and Cassano.

Ponte dell'Olio borders the following municipalities: Bettola, Gropparello, San Giorgio Piacentino, Vigolzone.

Demographic evolution

Notable people
Mara Romero Borella (born 1986), mixed martial artist
Marco Andreolli (born 1986), Italian professional footballer

References

Cities and towns in Emilia-Romagna